The Elem Indian Colony of Pomo Indians (also known as the Elem Band of Pomo and Sulfur Bank Band of Pomo Indians) are a Native American band of Pomo based on  near Clearlake Oaks, California on the Eastern shore of Clear Lake. The Elem Indian Colony reservation was originally formed under the name Sulfur Bank Rancheria in 1949. The reservation lies between Clearlake Oaks to its north, and Clearlake to its south.

The tribe was organized in 1936 and has a population of about 100. Currently they are attempting to regain ownership of Rattlesnake Island near their reservation, where they had held ceremonies for centuries.

Education
The colony is served by the Konocti Unified School District.

See also
Sulphur Bank Mine

References
 Economic Development Administration. U.S. Dept of Commerce. California Report: Sulfur Bank Rancheria/Elem Indian Colony (p. 298-299) . File retrieved May 5, 2007.Dead Link

American Indian reservations in California
Federally recognized tribes in the United States
Native American tribes in California
Geography of Lake County, California